Alexander Osipovich Gelfond (24 October 1906 – 7 November 1968) was a Soviet mathematician. Gelfond's theorem, also known as the Gelfond-Schneider theorem is named after him.

Biography

Alexander Gelfond was born in Saint Petersburg, Russian Empire, the son of a professional physician and amateur philosopher Osip Gelfond. He entered the Moscow State University in 1924, started his postgraduate studies there in 1927 and obtained his PhD in 1930. His advisors were Aleksandr Khinchin and Vyacheslav Stepanov.

In 1930 he stayed for five months in Germany (in Berlin and Göttingen) where he worked with Edmund Landau, Carl Ludwig Siegel and David Hilbert. In 1931 he started teaching as a Professor at the Moscow State University and worked there until the last day of his life. Since 1933 he also worked at the Steklov Institute of Mathematics.

In 1939 he was elected a Corresponding member of the Academy of Sciences of the Soviet Union for his works in the field of Cryptography. According to Vladimir Arnold, during World War II Gelfond was the Chief Cryptographer of the Soviet Navy.

Results
Gelfond obtained important results in several mathematical domains including number theory, analytic functions, integral equations and the history of mathematics, but his most famous result is his eponymous theorem:

This is the famous 7th Hilbert's problem. Gelfond proved a special case of the theorem in 1929, when he was a postgraduate student and fully proved it in 1934. The same theorem was independently proven by Theodor Schneider, and so the theorem is often known as the Gelfond–Schneider theorem. In 1929 Gelfond proposed an extension of the theorem known as the Gelfond's conjecture that was proven by Alan Baker in 1966.

After his works an infinite number of transcendentals could be easily obtained. Some of them are named in Gelfond's honor:
 is known as the Gelfond–Schneider constant
 is known as Gelfond's constant.

Notes

References

External links

1906 births
1968 deaths
Mathematicians from Saint Petersburg
People from Sankt-Peterburgsky Uyezd
Russian Jews
Soviet mathematicians
Number theorists
Russian cryptographers
Moscow State University alumni
Academic staff of Moscow State University
Corresponding Members of the USSR Academy of Sciences
Recipients of the Order of Lenin
Recipients of the Order of the Red Banner of Labour